Le tigre se parfume à la dynamite (Our Agent Tiger) is a 1965 secret agent spy film directed by Claude Chabrol and starring and written by Roger Hanin as the Tiger. It is a sequel to the 1964 film Le Tigre aime la chair fraiche.

Plot
The Tiger is sent to oversee the excavation of a sunken ship. While busy retrieving the gold treasure inside the vessel, The Tiger is constantly thwarted by international enemies. Among them is an old Nazi named Hans von Wunchendorf who dreams of world domination. He hides behind the codename "The Orchid" and needs the treasure to sustain a worldwide network of exiled former comrades. Once sanified by the gold his organisation plans to realise the endsieg after all.

Cast
Roger Hanin as Louis Rapière, "le Tigre"
Margaret Lee as Pamela Mitchum / Patricia Johnson
Michel Bouquet as Jacques Vermorel
Micaela Pignatelli as Sarita Sanchez 
Carlos Casaravilla as Ricardo Sanchez
José Nieto as Pepe Nieto
José María Caffarel as Colonel Pontarlier 
George Rigaud as Commander Damerec

Bibliography

References

External links

1965 films
1960s spy thriller films
Films directed by Claude Chabrol
French spy thriller films
French sequel films
Parody films based on James Bond films
1960s French films